Christos Angourakis (Greek: Χρήστος Αγγουράκης; 24 August 1952 – 22 February 2022) was a Greek Paralympic athlete who competed mainly in category F53 throwing events.

Born in Greece, Angourakis competed in the javelin throw and shot put at the 1996 Summer Paralympics, then in the discus throw and javelin throw at the 2000 Summer Paralympics. At the 2004 Summer Paralympics, he competed in the javelin throw and won  the bronze medal in the shot put.

He died on 22 February 2022, at the age of 69.

References

1952 births
2022 deaths
Athletes (track and field) at the 1988 Summer Paralympics
Athletes (track and field) at the 1992 Summer Paralympics
Athletes (track and field) at the 1996 Summer Paralympics
Athletes (track and field) at the 2000 Summer Paralympics
Athletes (track and field) at the 2004 Summer Paralympics
Greek male discus throwers
Greek male javelin throwers
Greek male shot putters
Medalists at the 1992 Summer Paralympics
Medalists at the 1988 Summer Paralympics
Medalists at the 2004 Summer Paralympics
Paralympic athletes of Greece
Paralympic bronze medalists for Greece
Paralympic silver medalists for Greece
Paralympic medalists in athletics (track and field)
Wheelchair javelin throwers
Wheelchair shot putters
Paralympic javelin throwers
Paralympic shot putters
Athletes from Heraklion
20th-century Greek people